"No Love" is a 1981 song by Joan Armatrading from the album Walk Under Ladders. The single reached No. 50 in the UK Singles Chart on 30 January 1982.

Personnel
Joan Armatrading – lead vocal
Hugh Burns – guitar
Mel Collins – saxophone
Ray Cooper – tambourine
Tony Levin – bass
Steve Lillywhite – production, backing vocal
Jerry Marotta – drums, harmony vocal
Nick Plytas – organ, synthesizer
Gary Sanford – backing vocal

References

1982 singles
Joan Armatrading songs
Songs written by Joan Armatrading
1981 songs
A&M Records singles
Song recordings produced by Steve Lillywhite